EurovisionAgain, usually stylized as #EurovisionAgain, was an initiative that ran from 21 March 2020 to 20 November 2021 to re-broadcast previous finals of the Eurovision Song Contest on YouTube. Originally conceived by journalist Rob Holley, it eventually became a collaborative effort between Eurovision fans, the European Broadcasting Union (EBU) and its member broadcasters.

History 
Upon hearing about the cancellation of the Eurovision Song Contest 2020 due to the COVID-19 pandemic, journalist Rob Holley launched an initiative to watch a past contest on YouTube every week as a replacement, eventually giving it the title EurovisionAgain. The initiative quickly became popular, so the EBU itself decided to partake. Every Saturday (which was shifted to the third Saturday of every month starting from 18 July 2020) at 21:00 CEST, the Eurovision YouTube channel would re-broadcast a final of a previous contest, revealed by the EurovisionAgain team 15 minutes before the start. Contests prior to 2004 were available for a limited time.

The initiative was generally received as a welcome distraction for Eurovision fans during the COVID-19 lockdowns. On Twitter, #EurovisionAgain regularly became a trending topic and received positive reactions from past participants. As part of the initiative, Holley collected over £24,700 for UK-based LGBTQ+ charities. The 2020 season ended with a special edition, where the 26 most popular songs that did not qualify for the final, one from each country, as chosen via the official Eurovision social media handles, were streamed and put to a fan-vote. Iceland's 2016 entry, "Hear Them Calling" by Greta Salóme, won the fan-vote.

Unlike the contents shown in 2020, the pre-2004 broadcasts were made available for a full month rather than one week.

In August 2021, the EBU confirmed that they were planning to broadcast "as many finals as we can over the next few years" through the initiative. Despite this, there were no further updates on whether the initiative would return after 2021, and in August 2022, the EurovisionAgain Twitter account changed its biography line to "#EurovisionAgain - ran sync viewings of classic Eurovision Song Contests during the 2020/21 lockdowns", implying that the initiative had been concluded.

Availability 
The initiative was well received by fans as it had made it possible for viewers to experience older Eurovision finals, and also allowed fans access to higher quality copies of older finals than what was previously available. Due to copyright agreements, the EBU only has ownership of contests aired since 2004, with individual host broadcasters owning the rights to those before that. A large majority of the existing finals, especially those in the former half of the contest's history, had previously only been available as video tape recordings, often with generational loss, especially those from the 1950s and 60s.

Format 
Each replayed final is broadcast as a premiere on the Eurovision Song Contest's official YouTube channel, with fans encouraged to vote for their favorites during the interval. Once the broadcast ends, the final remains on YouTube for one month, and the fan vote results are announced via Twitter. The selection of each broadcast is kept secret until 15 minutes before the start of the broadcast, with various hints and clues being posted on the EurovisionAgain Twitter account in the days and hours prior. For most of the final replays, a previous winner, participant, presenter or producer of the chosen year pre-records an introduction to be uploaded along with the reveal of which year is being broadcast. For the 2021 season, the broadcasts also included fan-made modern re-imaginings of the 20th-century contests' scoreboards, using 3D animation in the graphical style of the original scoreboards.

Rebroadcast contests 
Twenty-six of the previous contest finals were broadcast as part of EurovisionAgain, with two additional special broadcasts.

Notes

References 

Eurovision Song Contest
Recurring events established in 2020
2020 web series debuts
2020s YouTube series
Cultural responses to the COVID-19 pandemic